The Harvey Lea House was a historic house on Russell Mountain Road (County Road 70), just north of Russell, Arkansas.  It was a -story wood-frame structure, with a side-gable roof and weatherboard siding.  The roof gables had exposed rafter ends and large brackets in the Craftsman style, and a recessed porch supported by square posts.  A gabled dormer projected from the front roof face.  The house, built about 1925, was one of Russell's finest examples of Craftsman architecture.

The house was listed on the National Register of Historic Places in 1992.  It has been marked as destroyed in the Arkansas Historic Preservation Program database.

See also
National Register of Historic Places listings in White County, Arkansas

References

Houses on the National Register of Historic Places in Arkansas
Houses completed in 1925
Houses in White County, Arkansas
Demolished buildings and structures in Arkansas
National Register of Historic Places in White County, Arkansas
1925 establishments in Arkansas
American Craftsman architecture in Arkansas